Bishop's Waltham Town were a football club based in Bishop's Waltham, Hampshire,  and ran for over a hundred years.

History
Bishop's Waltham Town FC were originally established in 1901 and initially played in the Meon Valley League before joining the Southampton League, where they held membership for many years.

The eighties finally saw their fortunes take off. In 1983/84 they won promotion to the Premier Division for the first time, and two years later they won the title for what was their first serious piece of silverware. The club were then elected to the Hampshire League Division 2, where they finished 3rd to win promotion to Division 1. Bishop's Waltham then consolidated in the top-flight, enjoying success in 1991/92 when they beat Whitchurch United 3-1 to win the inaugural League Cup, and in 1992/93 when they were league runners-up to Pirelli General. Fortunes declined after this, and by 1997 they were in Division 3 - but in 1999 the league was re-structured with the top-flight being renamed as the Premier Division (for clubs with fixed barriers and floodlights) and after making these requirements at Priory Park, Bishop's Waltham were included.

In 2004 the original Hampshire League was absorbed by the expanded Wessex League, with the new set-up having three divisions. Bishop's Waltham were placed in the middle tier, but the step-up was too much and in 2005/06 they were relegated. They continued to struggle, and sadly had to pull out midway through the following season.

The club soon regrouped and when the Wessex League was reduced to two divisions in 2007, the new Hampshire Premier League was subsequently formed with Bishop's Waltham Town becoming founder members, along with Sporting BTC   (a highly successful local side, who after their 1995 formation had swept all before them in the Southampton League and Hampshire League 2004). After both teams finished midtable, they then decided to join forces and become known as Sporting Bishop's Waltham.

The club continued on in a steady midtable position but despite the merger, they found success hard to come by. In bid to attract more local support they changed their name back to Bishop's Waltham Town for the 2013/14 season, but after a difficult start and loss of key personnel, they withdrew from the league for the second time in 7 years. Alas, this time there was no reprieve and the club sadly folded.

Honours
Hampshire League Cup
Winners 1991/92
Hampshire League Division 1
Runners-up 1992/93
Southampton League Premier Division
Champions 1985/86
Meon Valley League
Champions 1921/22 and 22/23
Meon Valley League Pink Cup
Winners 1921/22, 22/23 and 23/24

Records

League

Successor Club
Fortunately, it was not the end of football in the town as Bishop's Waltham Dynamoes have since risen to prominence in the Southampton League. The club use the same venues and with a thriving Youth section are ambitious to restore past glories.

References

External links
Official site
Sporting Bishops Waltham at the HPFL website

Defunct football clubs in England
Defunct football clubs in Hampshire
Association football clubs established in 1901
1901 establishments in England
Bishop's Waltham
Southampton Saturday Football League
Hampshire League
Hampshire League 2004
Wessex Football League
Association football clubs disestablished in 2013